The first Ro-56, originally named Submarine No. 30, was an Imperial Japanese Navy Type L submarine, the final unit of the L2 subclass. Except for a few months in 1926, she was in commission from 1922 to 1938.

Design and description
The submarines of the Type L2 sub-class were close copies of the British L-class submarine built under license in Japan. They differed from the preceding L1 subclass in the deletion of the two broadside-firing torpedo tubes and the two torpedoes for them, the use of domestically produced diesel engines and batteries, and a different battery arrangement. They displaced  surfaced and  submerged.

For surface running, the submarines were powered by two  Vickers diesel engines, each driving one propeller shaft. When submerged, each propeller was driven by an  electric motor. They could reach  on the surface and  underwater.

The submarines were armed with four internal  torpedo tubes, all in the bow, and carried a total of eight Type 44 torpedoes. They were also armed with a single  deck gun.

Construction and commissioning

Ro-56 was laid down as Submarine No. 30 on 10 July 1920 by Mitsubishi at Kobe, Japan. Launched on 11 May 1921, she was completed and commissioned on 16 January 1922, the final unit of the L2 subclass.

Service history

Upon commissioning, Submarine No. 30 was assigned to Submarine Division 4 — in which she spent her entire active career — in Submarine Squadron 1 in the 1st Fleet. She was renamed Ro-56 on 1 November 1924. Submarine Division 4 was attached to the Yokosuka Naval District on 1 December 1925, in which it remained for the remainder of Ro-56′s career. Ro-56 was assigned that day to the Yokosuka Defense Division. She was decommissioned and placed in reserve on 1 April 1926.

Ro-56 was recommissioned on 1 August 1926, and was assigned to the Yokosuka Defense Division again that day, serving in that duty until 1 December 1927. She later served in the Yokosuka Defense Division again from 30 November 1929 to 15 November 1934.

Ro-56 was decommissioned and placed in the Fourth Reserve in the Yokosuka Naval District on 15 December 1938. The Japanese struck her from the Navy list on 1 April 1940, and that day she became a stationary hulk with the name Haisen No. 13.

Notes

Bibliography
, History of Pacific War Extra, "Perfect guide, The submarines of the Imperial Japanese Forces", Gakken (Japan), March 2005, 
The Maru Special, Japanese Naval Vessels No.43 Japanese Submarines III, Ushio Shobō (Japan), September 1980, Book code 68343-44
The Maru Special, Japanese Naval Vessels No.132 Japanese Submarines I "Revised edition", Ushio Shobō (Japan), February 1988, Book code 68344-36
The Maru Special, Japanese Naval Vessels No.133 Japanese Submarines II "Revised edition", Ushio Shobō (Japan), March 1988, Book code 68344-37

Ro-53-class submarines
Japanese L type submarines
Ships built by Mitsubishi Heavy Industries
1921 ships